Athletics at the 2017 Summer Deaflympics was held at the İlkadım Athletics Stadium.

Medal summary

Medalists
* Indicates the athlete only competed in the preliminary heats and received medals.

Men

Women

References

External links
 Athletics

2017 Summer Deaflympics
International athletics competitions hosted by Turkey
2017